Country Style is an American musical variety show on the DuMont Television Network from July 29 to November 25, 1950, on Saturday nights from 8–9 p.m. Eastern Time

The setting was a small town bandstand on a Saturday night. Musical numbers, comedy vignettes and square dancing took place around the bandstand, where Alvy West and the Volunteer Firemens’ Band played. The host was Peggy Ann Ellis.  Regulars included Pat Adair, Bob Austin, Emily Barnes, Gordon Dilworth, and The Folk Dancers.

As with most DuMont series, no episodes are known to survive. This series should not be confused with the radio and TV series Country Style, USA (1957–60).

Jimmy Dean program
During 1957, Jimmy Dean hosted Country Style, a daytime TV version of The Jimmy Dean Show, which aired on WTOP-TV in Washington, DC, on weekday mornings.

See also
List of programs broadcast by the DuMont Television Network
List of surviving DuMont Television Network broadcasts
1950-51 United States network television schedule

Bibliography
David Weinstein, The Forgotten Network: DuMont and the Birth of American Television (Philadelphia: Temple University Press, 2004) 
Alex McNeil, Total Television, Fourth edition (New York: Penguin Books, 1980) 
Tim Brooks and Earle Marsh, The Complete Directory to Prime Time Network TV Shows, Third edition (New York: Ballantine Books, 1964)

External links 
 
 DuMont historical website

1950 American television series debuts
1950 American television series endings
DuMont Television Network original programming
Black-and-white American television shows
1950s American variety television series
Lost television shows